Promes is a surname. Notable people with the surname include:

Jerold Promes (born 1984), Dutch footballer
Marino Promes (born 1977), Dutch footballer
Quincy Promes (born 1992), Dutch footballer

 Dutch-language surnames